The Jangil (also Rutland Jarawa) were one of the Andamanese indigenous peoples of the Andaman Islands, located in the Bay of Bengal. They were distributed through the interior of Rutland Island, and were given the name Rutland Jarawa because it was supposed that they were related to the neighboring Jarawa people. Since they were first encountered and documented in the mid-19th century, direct contacts with them remained scarce and they generally sought to avoid such encounters. There are  only a few reported instances where outsiders (the British and Indian settlers) encountered individuals from the group, the last such case being in 1907. Expeditions sent to the interior of the island in the 1920s failed to find any signs of current habitation; their disappearance and extinction were most likely the result of introduced diseases to which they had no natural immunity. British naval officer Maurice Vidal Portman, one of a few outsiders to have made contact with Jangils, reported that their language was unintelligible to him but seemed to have noticeable connections with Jarawa.

References

1920s disestablishments in British India
History of the Andaman and Nicobar Islands
Indigenous peoples of South Asia
Extinct languages of Asia
Ethnic groups in the Andaman and Nicobar Islands
Scheduled Tribes of the Andaman and Nicobar Islands
Languages of India
Ongan languages
Extinct ethnic groups
Languages extinct in the 20th century